This is a list of bridges and tunnels on the National Register of Historic Places in the U.S. state of Rhode Island.

References

 
Rhode Island
Bridges
Bridges